John J. Donahue (December 30, 1904 – November 10, 1984) was an American football player and coach.

Playing career
Donahue played guard on the Peabody High School football team. He played guard and tackle for Boston College from 1922 to 1925 and was captain his senior year. On August 9, 1926 he signed with the Providence Steam Roller. He played in 13 games (9 starts) for the team at left guard. Donahue later played semi-pro football for the University of Peabody and Pere Marquette.

In addition to playing football, Donahue was also a member of the Boston College Eagles baseball team and a boxer.

Coaching career
In 1928, Donahue joined the faculty of East Bridgewater High School as head football coach and history teacher. In 1932 he became the first ever football coach at North Quincy High School. He continued to coach the team until his resignation in 1960. He compiled a 128-95-20 record with the school. Donahue also served as NQHS' golf coach and guided the team to a state championship in 1948. He retired from teaching in 1971.

Death
Donahue died on November 10, 1984 at Quincy City Hospital following a long illness. He was buried in Mount Wollaston Cemetery

References

1904 births
1984 deaths
American football guards
American football tackles
Boston College Eagles football players
Providence Steam Roller players
High school football coaches in Massachusetts
People from Peabody, Massachusetts
Sportspeople from Quincy, Massachusetts
Players of American football from Massachusetts
Sportspeople from Essex County, Massachusetts